Neadmete okutanii is a species of sea snail, a marine gastropod mollusk in the family Cancellariidae, the nutmeg snails.

Description

Distribution
Specimens of Neadmete okutanii have been recorded in Indonesia and Japan.

References

Cancellariidae
Gastropods described in 1974